Patma-Banasirakan Handes ( (ՊԲՀ, PBH); , Istoriko-Filologicheskii Zhurnal; "Historical-Philological Journal") is a quarterly peer-reviewed academic journal published by the Armenian National Academy of Sciences. It covers research on Armenian history (particularly material related to the ancient and medieval periods), art history, literature, and linguistics. The journal also publishes discussions and debates, book reviews and also has special sections devoted to science news and Armenian Diasporan affairs. It occasionally publishes obituaries and biographies and commemorates the lives of noted scholars involved in Armenian studies. 

It was established in 1958 by academician Mkrtich G. Nersisyan, who was the journal's first editor-in-chief until his death in 1999. According to Razmik Panossian "it became a trend-setting journal for historians, linguists, philologists and for scholars in the humanities in general. This influential journal brought together all branches of Armenian studies, systematically consolidating research on culture, ancient law and philosophy, architecture, language and history." 
 
Most articles that were published in Armenian during the Soviet era included a Russian abstract, while those articles published in Russian had an Armenian abstract. In recent years, following Armenia's independence in 1991, most articles have come to include English abstracts.

The journal's archives have recently undergone digitalization and articles can now be accessed from its official website. The current editor is Vardkes Mikayelyan.

See also 
 Lraber Hasarakakan Gitutyunneri
 Bazmavep
 Haigazian Armenological Review
 Handes Amsorya
 Revue des Études Arméniennes

References 

History journals
Armenian studies journals
Publications established in 1958
1958 establishments in Armenia
Multilingual journals
Armenian-language journals
Russian-language journals